Luis Angel Alejo (born March 27, 1974) is an American politician who served in the California State Assembly representing the 30th Assembly District, encompassing the Pajaro and Salinas valleys.

Biography

Early life
Born and raised in Watsonville, Alejo's family came to work in the agricultural fields of the Salinas, Santa Clara and Pajaro Valleys as migrant farmworkers in the 1950s.

Alejo graduated from the University of California, Berkeley with dual bachelor's degrees in political science and Chicano studies, and obtained his master's of education degree from Harvard University in administration, planning and social policy. He received his Juris Doctor (JD) from the University of California, Davis School of Law (King Hall), where he won the "Maggie Schelen" scholarship for public service.

After finishing his graduate and professional studies, Alejo returned to his hometown of Watsonville to work as a legal aid attorney where he championed the rights of working families throughout the Monterey Bay area.  He then worked as a staff attorney for the Monterey County Superior Court, where he assisted thousands of self-represented litigants throughout Monterey County who couldn't afford private attorneys. He has also worked as a high school teacher, focusing on "at-risk" children.

Career
Before his election to the State Legislature, Alejo was the mayor of Watsonville, California. He was elected to District 2 of the Watsonville City Council with nearly 80% of the vote and became mayor in November 2009.  He had become Vice Mayor in March 2009.

Prior to his public service, Alejo served as a Jesse M. Unruh Assembly Fellow where he worked as a legislative aide for Assemblymember Manny Diaz (D-San Jose).  He attended the University of California, Berkeley, the University of California, Davis School of Law (King Hall), and Harvard University.

Alejo was elected in June 2016 to represent District 1 on the Monterey County Board of Supervisors.

2014 California State Assembly

References

1974 births
Living people
California lawyers
Harvard Graduate School of Education alumni
Hispanic and Latino American mayors in California
Hispanic and Latino American state legislators in California
Mayors of places in California
Democratic Party members of the California State Assembly
People from Watsonville, California
UC Berkeley College of Letters and Science alumni
UC Davis School of Law alumni
21st-century American politicians